Jane Kendeigh (March 30, 1922 – July 19, 1987) was a US Navy flight nurse. She was the first naval flight nurse to fly to an active combat zone, serving at the Battle of Iwo Jima in the Pacific.

Kendeigh was born and raised in Ohio. She attended a nursing school in Cleveland.

World War II

After graduating, Kendeigh joined the first class of US Navy's School of Air Evacuation. It was composed of 24 pharmacist's mates and 24 nurses. They were trained for crash procedures and field survival, particularly in the face of simulated attacks. They were also trained in treating patients in high altitudes. The program included aeromedical physiology, physical conditioning and calisthenics. The program made it possible to rescue wounded soldiers sent to distant lands during the war.

Kendeigh joined the evacuation mission to an active combat zone in the Pacific. She was on board in Naval Air Transport Service R4D with other flight nurses. On March 6, 1945, at 22 years old, Kendeigh was the first flight nurse to land at Iwo Jima. She recalled that some men whistled after witnessing a woman in the combat area. The evacuation mission lasted until March 21, 1945. They were able to rescue and attend to 2,393 Marines and sailors.

When Kendeigh returned to the US, she participated in a war bond drive. Shortly after, she was requested to return to the Pacific. On April 7, 1945, she landed and served at the Battle of Okinawa. She was the first flight nurse to arrive at Okinawa. Kendeigh also served at battlefronts in Marianas and Hawaii.

Flight nurses tended and evacuated 1,176,048 military patients during the war; only 46 died on the journey.

Death
Kendeigh died on July 19, 1987 in San Diego, California. She was 65 years old.

References

1922 births
1987 deaths
20th-century American people
American nurses
Female United States Navy nurses in World War II
American women nurses
Female wartime nurses